Zhang Wei was a member of Chinese Figure Skating National Team, a Chinese ice dancer, and a Single skater. With partner Wang Rui, they won the gold medal in 1999 Asian Winter Games. They placed 4th at the 1998 Cup of China (ISU JGP). They placed 10th at the 2000 Four Continents Figure Skating Championships.

Following Zhang's retirement from competitive skating, Zhang has worked as a coach and choreographer. Among Zhang's current and former students and clients are World Championships Champion Sui Wenjing, Han Cong, Four Continents Champion Yu Xiaoyu, Jin Yang, and Peng Cheng, Zhang Hao; China National Championships Bronze Medalist Wang Jialei, Thai National Champion Amy Alisara Arirachakaran, and Phanyaluck Raisuksiri;  and Singapore National Champion Anja Chong.  Zhang also worked as a figure skating judge for China.

In 2017, Zhang worked together with Chinese famous film director Zhang Yimou, who was also the general director of 2008 Beijing Olympic Opening Ceremony, for figure skating TV show 'Kua Jin Bing Xue Wang (跨界冰雪王)'.

2017 Figure skating TV Show 'Kua Jie Bing Xue Wang (跨界冰雪王)' - Director and Choreographer

2016 Amazing On Ice - Director and Choreographer

2009 – present official choreographer of China National Junior Team

2008-2012 Manager of Heilongjiang Jun Yi Interior Design and Engineering Co., Ltd.

2006-2008 Figure skating Coach of Fuji Ice Palace, Singapore

2004-2006 Head coach of Thailand National Figure Skating Junior Team

2003-2006 General Manager and Head Coach of Bangkok International Figure Skating Co., Ltd.

2001-2003 Figure skating coach, Super Ice World Kallang, Singapore

Results
(with Wang)

1997 the Paekdusan Prize (DPR Korea) - 7th Place

1996 Asian Figure Skating Championships – 7th Place

Competitive highlights
(Sui Wenjing / Han Cong)

(Yu Xiaoyu / Jin Yang)

Programs Choreographed
(Sui Wenjing / Han Cong)

(Yu XiaoYu /)

(Yu XiaoYu / Zhang Hao)

(Wang Wenting / Zhang Yan)

Choreographed Ice Show & Group Number

References

Chinese male ice dancers
Chinese figure skating coaches
Figure skating judges
Living people
Asian Games medalists in figure skating
Figure skaters at the 1999 Asian Winter Games
Asian Games gold medalists for China
Medalists at the 1999 Asian Winter Games
Year of birth missing (living people)
Competitors at the 2001 Winter Universiade